Pepete was the nickname of three Spanish matadors, all of whom died in the bullring.

 José Dámaso Rodríguez y Rodríguez (1824–1862)
 José Rodríguez Davié (1867–1899)
 José Gallego Mateo (1883–1910)

Lists of people by nickname